Thopramkudy (alternately spelled Thoprankudy) is a village in Vathikudy Gram panchayat, in Idukki Taluk located in Idukki district in the State of Kerala in South India. Thopramkudy is trying to become a village. State Highway 40 (Kerala) and State Highway 42 (Kerala) and a new highway Kalvary Mount-Munnar is passing through Thopramkudy. The hamlet is mentioned in the 2009 Malayalam movie Loudspeaker

Etymology 
It is believed that he was the first man to do cultivation and his place/house came to be known as Thoprankudy and eventually it changed to Thopramkudy.

History
Most of those farmers who had migrated to Thopramkudy and its environs consisted mainly of Catholic Christians. On 12 November 1969, a temple dedicated to Shri Dharmasashta was established to serve the spiritual needs of the Hindus. 60 years ago Sree Dharma Sastha Temple (Ayyappa) was established by the Tribals (Anakootil Krishnankutti, Karikallil Kuttan, Kelan Raman (Mannathiparayil), Thandel Kuttappan, etc.). From 1959 on, the said temple lay under the protection and jurisdiction of the great association of hill tribals. As for Christian settlers, Kiliyarkadam church served their needs. When people began to migrate in large numbers, the establishment of a church at Thopramkudy became inevitable.

Transportation
Thopramkudy is well connected with other major cities and towns in kerala.state State Highway 40 (Kerala) State Highway 42 (Kerala) and a new tourist Highway Calvary Mount -  Munnar is also proposed through Thopramkudy .Thopramkudy is a connector of major cities and towns in Kerala and Tamilnadu like Adimaly - Kattappana - Kumily ,  Nedumkandam - Kochi , Munnar - Thiruvananthapuram , Nedumkandam - Thodupuzha , Kochi - Madurai , Alappuzha - Nedumkandam

Rail
There is no railwaylines in Idukki district. The major railway stations near Thopramkudy are Aluva railway station , Kottayam railway station , Bodinayakkanur

Airport
The nearest airport is Cochin International Airport Madurai Airport .

Religion
Thopramkudy is all about love and equality. For worshiping there are churches, temples and mosques. 60 years ago Sree Dharma Sastha Temple (Ayyappa) was established by the Tribals (Anakootil Krishnankutti, Karikallil Kuttan, Kelan Raman (Mannathiparayil), Thandel Kuttappan etc..), and it was the first temple in Thopramkudy.

Education
The first school was Gov. H.S. Thopramkudy.
 Govt. Higher secondary School, Thopramkudy
 St. Maria Gorethi LP School Thopramkudy
 Holy Family U P School Thopramkudy
 Marian Public School Thopramkudy
 Auxilium English Medium School Thopramkudy
 De Paul Public School Rajamudy, Thopramkudy 
 Mar Sleeva College of Arts & Science, Rajamudy , Thopramkudy

References

Cities and towns in Idukki district